The Ice Hockey Varsity Match is a longstanding competition between the Cambridge and Oxford University Ice Hockey Clubs.

Tradition places the origin of the match in 1885, when a game is said to have been played in St Moritz.  This date is recognised by the Hockey Hall of Fame, and prior to the 1985 Varsity Match, the International Ice Hockey Federation formally recognised the game played a century earlier as having been the first ice hockey match played in Europe.  However, there is no contemporary evidence that the 1885 match took place, and Oxford now claim that it was a bandy match.  If the 1885 date is accepted, this is the oldest rivalry in ice hockey.

The oldest surviving evidence of the competition is a team photo and roster from 1895, for a game played on Blenheim Lake in Oxford, although this was definitely a bandy match.  The first match usually counted as an ice hockey contest is that of 16 March 1900 at Princes Skating Club, although at Oxford's insistence, it was played using bandy sticks and a lacrosse ball.

The following year, another Varsity Match was played at Princes, this time with hockey skates and a puck.  However, a 1902 match at Blenheim Lake was again a bandy match.

The competition became established in 1909; the two universities then met each other on a European rink each year until World War I.  From 1927, the match has been played for the Patton Cup, named for Peter Patton, the first President of the British Ice Hockey Association.  It was then played most years until 1932, when it returned to England, being played at Richmond Ice Rink.  The annual matches of the 1930s may no longer have been of professional standard, but they were able to attract crowds up to 10,000 strong. In 2016, the Patton Cup was replaced by the King Edward VII Cup.

Other than a gap during World War II, the matches have continued annually ever since, and from 1996 alternated between Oxford Ice Rink and a rink nominated by Cambridge. After a two-decade campaign, championed by Prof. Bill Harris, Cambridge University opened their own rink for the 2019-2020 season and hosted the 2020 Match. Oxford, historically strengthened by Rhodes Scholars have won more than two-thirds of the encounters.

Results

References

University ice hockey in the United Kingdom
Oxbridge sporting rivalries
Ice hockey competitions in England
Ice hockey rivalries